This is a list of electoral district results for the 2022 Victorian state election for the Legislative Assembly.

|}

Results by electoral district

Albert Park

Ashwood

Bass

Bayswater

Bellarine

Benambra

Bendigo East

Bendigo West

Bentleigh

Berwick

Box Hill

Brighton

Broadmeadows

Brunswick

Bulleen

Bundoora

Carrum

Caulfield

Clarinda

Cranbourne

Croydon

Dandenong

Eildon

Eltham

Essendon

Eureka

Euroa

Evelyn

Footscray

Frankston

Geelong

Gippsland East

Gippsland South

Glen Waverley

Greenvale

Hastings

Hawthorn

Ivanhoe

Kalkallo

Kew

Kororoit

Lara

Laverton

Lowan

Macedon

Malvern

Melbourne

Melton

Mildura

Mill Park

Monbulk

Mordialloc

Mornington

Morwell

Mulgrave

Murray Plains

Narracan
The original election on 26 November 2022 for this seat was declared failed due to the death of the National Party candidate on 21 November. The supplementary election was held on 28 January 2023.

Narre Warren North

Narre Warren South

Nepean

Niddrie

Northcote

Oakleigh

Ovens Valley

Pakenham

Pascoe Vale

Point Cook

Polwarth

Prahran

Preston

Richmond

Ringwood

Ripon

Rowville

Sandringham

Shepparton

South Barwon

South-West Coast

St Albans

Sunbury

Sydenham

Tarneit

Thomastown

Warrandyte

Wendouree

Werribee

Williamstown

Yan Yean

References

Results of Victorian state elections
2022 Victorian state election